The Seroglazov culture (sometimes erroneously translated as Seroglazovka, or Seroglasovo culture) is a mesolithic culture. Pernitzka dated it according to 14C-dating to the beginning of the 7th millennium BC, others (who?) to the 11th-9th millennium BC of the Caspian Lowland (by Caspian Sea), from Ural River to Kuma-Manych Depression. It was discovered during the archaeological excavations near the Seroglazovka (Сероглазовка) stanitsa (Cossack settlement).

Archaeological cultures of Eastern Europe
Archaeological sites in Russia
Stone Age Europe